Pedro Villarreal (born December 9, 1987) is an American former professional baseball pitcher. He made his Major League Baseball (MLB) debut with the Reds in 2012. He throws and bats right-handed.

Career
Villarreal attended Seagoville High School in Dallas, Texas, where was a third baseman and pitcher. He attended Howard College, where he was a top pitcher on the baseball team.

Cincinnati Reds
The Reds drafted him in the seventh round of the 2008 Major League Baseball Draft.

He played six games for Gulf Coast Reds, the rookie class team, in 2008. He had a 7.71 ERA. Vallarreal played for rookie GCL Reds and single-A advanced Sarasota in 2009. He was a combined 1–5 with a 3.99 ERA in 5 games for the Reds and 9 for Sarasota. He played 23 games at Dayton in 2010, going 4–7 with a 3.84 ERA. In a six-game promotion to double-A Lynchburg, he was 0–3 with a 6.86 ERA. In 2011, he played for the single-A Bakersfield Blaze and the Carolina Mudcats, going a combined 11–7 with a 4.39 ERA in 10 games at Bakersfield and 17 at Carolina. He was added to the Reds 40-man roster on November 18, 2011 to be protected from the Rule 5 draft. He started the 2012 Season with AA Pensacola Blue Wahoos, until he was called up to AAA Louisville Bats on May 4, 2012.

Villarreal made his major league debut for the Reds on September 5, 2012, a loss to the Philadelphia Phillies. Villarreal entered the game in the top of the 9th inning in relief of Sean Marshall. He struck out Domonic Brown, the first batter he faced, and retired the next two batters for a perfect inning of mop-up relief. He was pulled for pinch hitter Denis Phipps in the bottom of the inning.  Villarreal was called up on June 5 to make his first Major League start for the Reds versus the Colorado Rockies, after Starting Pitcher Johnny Cueto was placed on the Disabled list He was outrighted off the roster on September 2, 2013.

Villarreal had his contract selected and was called up to the Reds on August 21, 2014.

He became a free agent on November 7, 2016.

Toros de Tijuana
On May 16, 2017, Villarreal signed with the Toros de Tijuana of the Mexican Baseball League. He became a free agent after the 2018 season.

References

External links

1987 births
Living people
American expatriate baseball players in Mexico
Bakersfield Blaze players
Baseball players from Texas
Carolina Mudcats players
Cincinnati Reds players
Dayton Dragons players
Gulf Coast Reds players
Howard Hawks baseball players
Louisville Bats players
Lynchburg Hillcats players
Major League Baseball pitchers
Mexican League baseball pitchers
Pensacola Blue Wahoos players
People from Edinburg, Texas
Sarasota Reds players
Tiburones de La Guaira players
American expatriate baseball players in Venezuela
Toros de Tijuana players